William Henry Hughes may refer to:

 Bill Hughes (musician) (1930–2018), American jazz trombonist and bandleader
 William H. Hughes (1864–1903), American businessman and politician from New York